Sebastian Preiß (born 8 February 1981) is a German handball player in the German national team. He began his career in the Handball-Bundesliga first national league at THW Kiel and currently plays for TBV Lemgo.

References 
 
 
 

1981 births
Living people
German male handball players
People from Ansbach
Sportspeople from Middle Franconia
People from Langenzenn